Marta Kostyuk was the defending champion, but lost to Wang Xiyu in the second round.

Qualifier Belinda Woolcock won the title, defeating Paula Badosa Gibert in the final, 7–6(7–3), 7–6(7–4).

Seeds

Draw

Finals

Top half

Bottom half

References
Main Draw

Burnie International - Singles
Burnie International